Lepidochrysops nyika is a butterfly in the family Lycaenidae. It is found in Malawi and Zambia.

Adults have been recorded on wing in September and October.

References

Butterflies described in 1961
Lepidochrysops